In-target probe, or ITP is a device used in computer hardware and microprocessor design, to control a target microprocessor or similar ASIC at the register level. It generally allows full control of the target device and allows the computer engineer access to individual processor registers, program counter, and instructions within the device. It allows the processor to be single-stepped or for breakpoints to be set. Unlike an in-circuit emulator (ICE), an In-Target Probe uses the target device to execute, rather than substituting for the target device.

See also
Hardware-assisted virtualization
In-circuit emulator
Joint Test Action Group

External links
 ITP700 Debug Port Design Guide - Intel

Embedded systems
Debugging